The Vincent Price Art Museum (VPAM) is an art museum located at East Los Angeles College in Monterey Park, California, US.

The museum is named after American actor Vincent Price who donated portions of his personal art collection to the college in 1957. The museum's collection now contains over 9,000 objects ranging from impressionist paintings to Japanese prints to objects from the Ancient Americas, 2,000 of which were donated by Price.

It has been a venue for underrepresented artists since its founding, organizing key solo exhibitions for Los Angeles-based artists including Laura Aguilar, Carlos Almaraz, Nao Bustamante, Rafa Esparza, Judithe Hernández, Manuel López, Star Montana and Shizu Saldamando. 

In 2014 the museum presented Who Cares Wins!, a solo exhibition for L.A. artist Michael C.Hsiung. The installation showcased more than one-hundred ink drawings, paintings, and other related mixed-media works featuring the artist’s signature graphic style, iconography, and wit.

Directors 
 Steven Wong (2021–present)
 Pilar Tompkins Rivas (2016–2020)
 Karen Rapp (2007–2015)
 Thomas Silliman (1957–2006)

References

External links
Official

Art museums and galleries in California
Museums established in 1957